Umbertide is a town and comune (township) of Italy, in the province of Perugia and  in northwestern Umbria, at the confluence of the Reggia river and the Tiber. It is 30 km (19 mi) North of Perugia and 20 km (12 mi) South of Città di Castello. With 16,607 inhabitants according to the 2017 census, Umbertide is one of the larger towns of Umbria; and basically flat. It is an industrial center producing machine tools, textiles, packaging material, and ceramics. Olive oil is produced, especially in Pierantonio and in its southwestern part.

Economy

Umbertide is an important centre of automotive factories. There is the headquarters of Tiberina holding, a car components group. Other important companies are Proma, Modulo and Terex Genie.

History
Umbertide or the surrounding area was inhabited in pre-Roman and Roman times. At the top of Monte Acuto has been discovered an umbrian fortification ("castelliere").
The nineteenth‑century archaeologist Mariano Guardabassi even attributed a small building at Lame, about 1 km from the center of the modern town, to the Etruscans, although this is by no means certain The Roman town of Pitulum Mergens, destroyed by Totila in the mid-6th century, may account for Roman remains in S. Maria delle Sette. In its present incarnation, Umbertide was founded in the 8th or 10th century, depending on the scholar; its original name was Fratta, and it received its present name in 1863 in honor of then Crown Prince Umberto and of Uberto or Umberto margrave of Tuscany, whose four sons, Adalberto, Ingilberto, Benedetto and Bonifacio, according to tradition, rebuilt the town in 796 on the ruins of Pitulum Mergens.

Main sights
Although there are remains of the medieval walls,  a few medieval houses, and part of the Rocca of Umbertide, or citadel, many of Umbertide's best monuments are of later periods.

Churches
Santa Maria della Reggia is the main church in town, a collegiate church often referred to simply as the Collegiata: it is an octagonal 16th century brick building topped by an elegant cupola, housing a few paintings by Niccolò Circignani. 
Santa Maria della Pietà with the attractive funerary chapel of the counts of Sorbello, is late medieval and Renaissance church. 
Santa Croce is a 17th‑century church, now housing a painting gallery, including a Deposition by Luca Signorelli. 
San Francesco is the largest church, built in Gothic architecture: in the early 21st century it was undergoing a major restoration that promised to be protracted. 
Cristo Risorto twentieth‑century church.

Beyond the city limits, the township's principal monuments are:
Castle of Civitella Ranieri, 5 km (3 mi) NE, one of the best-preserved medieval fortresses in Umbria.
Abbey of S. Salvatore di Montecorona 4 km (2.5 mi) S, which has a beautiful eleventh‑century crypt with early Romanesque capitals and naïve 18th century painted ceilings.
Castle of Polgeto, a medieval structure
Abbey church of S. Bartolomeo de' Fossi, sited on a sharp ridge with distant views on either side
Borgo Santa Giuliana: a walled medieval village of

References

External links
Official Site
Bill Thayer's site

(Incorporates text from Bill Thayer's site, by permission.)

Archaeological sites in Umbria
Etruscan sites
Cities and towns in Umbria
Castles in Italy